Love Me, Love Me Not is a British game show based on the Canadian version of the same name. It aired on ITV from 5 May to 13 September 1988 and hosted by Nino Firetto and Debbie Greenwood.

References

External links

1988 British television series debuts
1988 British television series endings
1980s British game shows
English-language television shows
ITV game shows
Television shows produced by Television South (TVS)